Sibley Township is the name of several places in the United States:

Sibley Township, Cloud County, Kansas
Sibley Township, Crow Wing County, Minnesota
Sibley Township, Sibley County, Minnesota
Sibley Township, Kidder County, North Dakota

Township name disambiguation pages